The word key space (or keyspace) is used in

 Key space (cryptography) for an algorithm refers to the set of all possible keys that can be used to initialize it
 Keyspace (distributed data store), an object in NoSQL data stores that can be seen as a schema in RDBMS databases